The term Book of the Covenant may mean:

The Torah in its entirety as understood by classical Judaism.
Books of the Covenant – two books in the canon of the Ethiopian Orthodox Church.
Covenant Code – the name given by academics to a text appearing in the Torah at Exodus 21:2–23:33.
Kitáb-i-'Ahd – written by Bahá'u'lláh, and part of the text of the Bahá'í Faith.
The Book of the Covenant mentioned in the Book of Exodus 24:7.